Rudolf Schoeller (27 April 1902 in Düren, Germany – 7 March 1978 in Grabs) was a racing driver from Switzerland.  He participated in a single Formula One World Championship Grand Prix, on 3 August 1952.  He retired from the race with shock absorber problems, and scored no championship points.

He was a member of the Ecurie Espadon.

Complete Formula One World Championship results
(key)

References 

1902 births
1978 deaths
Swiss racing drivers
Swiss Formula One drivers
Écurie Espadon Formula One drivers